is a 1987 Japanese drama film directed by Taku Shinjō, based on the 1985 novel  by Yasuhisa Shimazaki. The film is notable for the acting debut of teen singer Chisato Moritaka. Aitsu ni Koishite was released theatrically on May 30, 1987 as part of Pocari Sweat's Movie Caravan campaign.

Plot 
In Hidaka, Hokkaido, the Etō and Matsumae ranches rival each other over their thoroughbred horses. While the ranch owners do not see eye to eye, their grandchildren Shotarō Etō and Chisato Matsumae slowly develop feelings for each other. To prove the superiority of Hokkaido horses, Kinzō Matsumae proposes a 2,600 kilometer horseback journey across Japan. However, none of his riders are willing to take the challenge. Acting on his own, Shotarō takes Chisato's horse Gonta and embarks on the journey. Both horse and rider struggle to get along with each other while traveling to the southern tip of Hokkaido.

After crossing the Tsugaru Strait, Shotarō nearly freezes to death on Mount Hakkōda, but Gonta manages to carry him to a nearby inn. A local journalist learns of the duo and spreads the word on their adventure. After meeting up with Chisato in Tokyo, Shotarō and Gonta continue their journey southbound, enduring different challenges in Honshu. Meanwhile, Chisato learns from Shotarō's sister Komako that the rift between the Etō and Matsumae families was caused by a car accident that killed both Shotarō and Chisato's parents, with both families blaming each other for the tragedy.

Shotarō and Gonta reach the Kanmon Straits and attempt to cross it by raft after being denied a ride across the Kanmon Roadway Tunnel, but a low-flying helicopter causes them to fall into the sea and Shotarō develops pneumonia. Shotarō's grandfather Tetsunosuke meets up with him in Kitakyushu and urges him to return to Hidaka, but he refuses. While the duo crosses the dense forests of Shiiba, Miyazaki, Gonta collapses from exhaustion and Shotarō struggles to keep him warm from the heavy rain until Gonta recovers the next day. Tetsunosuke and Kinzō settle their differences after seeing Shotarō's determination to finish the journey. Shotarō and Gonta arrive in Kagoshima, with Chisato waiting for them among the crowd.

Cast 
 Shingo Kazami as Shotarō Etō
 Hitoshi Ueki as Tetsunosuke Etō
 Chisato Moritaka as Chisato Matsumae
 Kaku Takashina as Kinzō Matsumae
 Eisaku Shindō as Ryūji Kanamori
 Chikako Yuri as Komako Etō
 Masanori Sera as the Hakodate sailor
 Shigeru Izumiya as the middle-aged Aomori man
 Jun Hamamura as the Mount Hakkōda innkeeper
 Kappei Ina as the Mount Hakkōda journalist
 Mitsuko Baisho as the Sendai wife
 Yoshio Harada as the Sendai husband
 Kenji Sagara as the Kōriyama boy
 Tetsuya Takeda as the Gasoline station man
 Yūko Watanabe as the Cashier
 Tokue Hanasawa as the Kishimen shop owner
 Yōko Ishino as the Kyoto girl
 Hiroshi Katsuno as the Police officer
 Masakane Yonekura as the Kokura veterinarian
 Shinya Owada as the Kagoshima reporter

Music 
Ending:
 "New Season" by Chisato Moritaka
 Lyrics: HIRO
 Music/Arrangement: Hideo Saitō

References

External links 
 
 Aitsu ni Koishite at AllCinema
 Aitsu ni Koishite at Kinenote

1987 films
1987 drama films
1980s Japanese-language films
Films about horses
Films set in Aomori Prefecture
Films set in Fukushima Prefecture
Films set in Hokkaido
Films set in Kagoshima
Films set in Kitakyushu
Films set in Kyoto
Films set in Miyagi Prefecture
Films set in Tokyo
Films shot in Fukuoka Prefecture
Films shot in Fukushima Prefecture
Films shot in Japan
Films shot in Kyoto
Films shot in Tokyo
Toho films